Beautiful Life is the second studio album by the American band Vallejo, released in 1998.

Production
DJ Hurricane contributed to four of the album's tracks.

Critical reception
The Hartford Courant thought that "although the playing is accomplished and the singing competent, once you get past the spicy rhythms, the songs tend to sag from that sinking derivative feeling." Texas Monthly called the album "a polished and amiable but mostly nondescript blend of hard rock hooks and funky jamming, heavily seasoned with Latin touches and a hippie-meets-hip-hop vibe." The Virginian-Pilot wrote that "the problem with most of Beautiful Life is that Latin rhythms melded with '70s rock sound like '70s rock ... Hard funk mixed with '70s rock also sounds like '70s rock."

AllMusic wrote that "while the lyrics leave a little to be desired ... the focus is on catchy hooks and rock punch."

Track listing
All songs composed by A.J. Vallejo, Alejandro Vallejo and Omar Vallejo except where specified

"Classico" (Vallejo) – 3:54
"Once Again" – 3:26
"Beautiful Life" – 4:10
"2053 (21st Century)" – 4:07
"If I Was President" – 3:40
"All in Your Head" (Vallejo) – 3:27
"Die Trying" – 4:01
"Naive" – 3:47
"Wasting My Time" (Bruce Castleberry, A.J. Vallejo, Alejandro Vallejo, O. Vallejo) – 4:10
"Snake in the Grass" (Samuel Barnes, DJ Hurricane, J.C. Olivier, Castleberry, A.J. Vallejo, Alejandro Vallejo, O. Vallejo) – 3:16
"Ya Me Voy" – 3:02
"Immortal" – 4:44
"Irish Man Lost in Spain" (composer unspecified) – 1:44 *
* Hidden track

Produced and Mixed by Steve Peck

Bobby Francavillo - Executive Producer

Additional musicians

DJ Hurricane

Credits

Bruce Castleberry - Bamboo Pipe, Guitar
DJ Hurricane - Remixing
Bobby Filarowicz - Assistant Engineer
Shayn Groves - Engineer
Scott Hull - Mastering
Neill King - Engineer, Mixing, Producer
Chris Manning - Assistant Engineer
Mike Scotella - Assistant Engineer
Jim Scott - Mixing
Diego Simmons - Congas, Percussion, Timbales
Jason Stokes - Assistant Engineer
A.J. Vallejo - Assistant Engineer, Guitar, Vocals
Alejandro Vallejo - Drums, Percussion
Omar Vallejo - Bass, Mixing, Background Vocals
André Zweers - Digital Editing
Bobby Francavillo - Executive Producer

References

Vallejo (band) albums
1998 albums